John Dobson Cormick (22 January 1880 – 2 August 1957) was an Australian rules footballer who played with South Melbourne from 1902–1903 in the Victorian Football League (VFL). Cormick played in 5 games, scoring 3 goals.

Notes

External links 

1880 births
1957 deaths
Australian rules footballers from Melbourne
Sydney Swans players
West Melbourne Football Club players
People from Port Melbourne